Villa Palmeras is one of the forty subbarrios of Santurce, a barrio of San Juan, Puerto Rico.

Demographics
In 2000, Villa Palmeras had a population of 2,648.

In 2010, Villa Palmeras had a population of 2,351 and a population density of 39,183.3 persons per square mile.

Pedro Pierluisi created a political campaign video with residents of Villa Palmeras when he was running for governor in 2015.

The municipality of San Juan provided economic incentives to businesses in Villa Palmeras in the 2010s.

San José Cemetery
The San José Cemetery in Villa Palmeras is the final resting place of many famous Puerto Rican musicians including Rafael Cepeda, Pellín Rodríguez, Tommy Olivencia, Rafael Cortijo, Ismael Rivera and Sammy Ayala of El Gran Combo.

Gallery

See also
 
 List of communities in Puerto Rico

References

Santurce, San Juan, Puerto Rico
Municipality of San Juan